Montevitozzo is a village in Tuscany, central Italy, administratively a frazione of the comune of Sorano, province of Grosseto, in the tuff area of southern Maremma. At the time of the 2001 census its population amounted to 106.

Geography 

The territory of Montevitozzo is composed also by the hamlets of Casa della Fonte, Casella, Cerretino, Le Capannelle, Le Porcarecce, Il Poggio, Marcelli and Ronzinami.

History 
The village was founded by the Aldobrandeschi in the 12th century and then conquered by Orvieto in 1284. It was then held by the Republic of Siena (15th century), by the Orsini from Pitigliano (16th century) and by the Medicis (17th century).

Main sights 
 San Giacomo (13th century), main parish church of the village, it was built in the late 14th century and then restructured many times.
 Immacolata Concezione (19th century)
 Chapel of Sant'Antonio Abate, small church in the hamlet of Marcelli.
 Villa Orsini (16th century), fortified villa built by the Orsini family during the Renaissance.
 Castle of Montevitozzo, commonly known as Roccaccia, it is the old castle of the village situated on the top of the Monte Vitozzo. It's now in ruins.

References

Bibliography 
 Aldo Mazzolai, Guida della Maremma. Percorsi tra arte e natura, Florence, Le Lettere, 1997.

See also 
 Castell'Ottieri
 Cerreto, Sorano
 Elmo, Sorano
 Montebuono, Sorano
 Montorio, Sorano
 San Giovanni delle Contee
 San Quirico, Sorano
 San Valentino, Sorano
 Sovana

Frazioni of Sorano